O'Donohue is a surname, and may refer to:
Becky O'Donohue (born 1980), reality television participant
Daniel Anthony O'Donohue (20th century), United States Ambassador to Burma
Edward O'Donohue (born 1974), Australian politician
Jessie O'Donohue (born 1980), reality television participant
John O'Donohue (1956–2008), poet and philosopher
John F. O'Donohue (21st century), American actor
Michael O'Donohue (1835–1912), Irish-American builder and architect 
Peter O'Donohue (born 1923), former Australian rules footballer
Ryan O'Donohue (born 1984), American voice actor
Tony O'Donohue (born 1933), Canadian politician
William O'Donohue (born 1957), American psychologist

See also
O'Donoghue
Donohue

Anglicised Irish-language surnames